Aingya may refer to several places in Burma:

Aingya, Kalaw
 Aingya, Tantabin